János Németh (31 July 1933 – 1 March 2021) was a Hungarian jurist, lawyer, and professor. He was President of the Faculty of Law of the Eötvös Loránd University for several decades.

Biography
He worked briefly as a lawyer before he was hired by Eötvös Loránd University, where he was affiliated until 2003, when he became a Professor Emeritus. He was deputy general rector of the university from 1993 to 1997. From 2004 to 2007, he served on the General Assembly of the Hungarian Academy of Sciences. He also served as an arbitrator on the  until 1997.

In 1990, Németh was elected chairman of the National Election Office in 1990, a position he held until 1997. During this period, the Office resolved many issues regarding the Hungarian election process. In 1997, the Hungarian National Assembly elected him President of the Constitutional Court of Hungary in a multipartisan vote. He was forced to resign in 2003 due to the fact that he had reached the age of 70.

János Németh died on 1 March 2021 at the age of 87.

Publications
A rendkívüli perorvoslatok a magyar polgári jogban
Polgári jog – Családjog – Polgári eljárásjog
Polgári eljárásjog
A polgári perrendtartás magyarázata
Polgári perjog I–II.
Polgári nemperes eljárások

References

1933 births
2021 deaths
People from Újpest
20th-century Hungarian lawyers
Hungarian judges
Eötvös Loránd University alumni
Academic staff of Eötvös Loránd University
Constitutional Court of Hungary judges